This is a list is of music videos directed by Hype Williams.

1990s

1991
 BWP – "We Want Money"
 Main Source – "Just Hangin' Out"

1992
 Strictly Roots – "Duck the Boys in Blue"
 Zhigge – "Rakin' in the Dough"
 Cutty Ranks – "Living Condition"

1993
 Erick Sermon – "Hittin' Switches"
 Positive K – "I Got a Man" (version 1)
 Mangu – "La Playa"
 K7 – "Zunga Zeng"
 M.O.P. – "How About Some Hardcore"
 K7 – "Come Baby Come"
 Poor Righteous Teachers – "Nobody Move"
 Mysterme – "Unsolved Mysterme"

1994
 Sam Sneed feat. Dr. Dre – "U Better Recognize"
 Craig Mack feat. Notorious B.I.G., LL Cool J, Rampage and Busta Rhymes – "Flava in Ya Ear" (remix)
 Wu-Tang Clan – "Can It Be All So Simple"
 Jodeci – "Feenin'" (Co-directed with DeVante Swing)
 Mic Geronimo – "Shit's Real"
 Da Bush Babees – "We Run Things (It's Like That)"
 Gravediggaz – "Diary of a Madman"
 Craig Mack – "Get Down"
 Wu-Tang Clan – "Wu-Tang Clan Ain't Nuthing ta Fuck Wit/Shame on a Nigga"
 Miss Jones – "Where I Wanna Be Boy"
 Casserine – "Why Not Take All of Me"
 Mary J. Blige – "Be Happy" (co-directed with Sean "Diddy" Combs) (uncredited)
 Men At Large – "Let's Talk About It"
 Usher – "Think of You"
 Usher – "The Many Ways"

1995
 Snow – "Anything for You"
 Naughty by Nature – "Craziest"
 The Notorious B.I.G. – "One More Chance" (version 2: remix)
 Warren G – "So Many Ways"
 LL Cool J feat. Boyz II Men – "Hey Lover"
 LL Cool J – "Doin' It"
 Brandy – "Baby"
 The Notorious B.I.G. – "Warning"
 The Notorious B.I.G. – "Big Poppa" (co-directed with Sean "Diddy" Combs)
 Brandy feat. Queen Latifah, MC Lyte and Yo-Yo – "I Wanna Be Down" (version 2: remix)
 Adina Howard – "Freak Like Me"
 The Notorious B.I.G. – "One More Chance" (version 1)
 Guru feat. Chaka Khan – "Watch What You Say"
 Montell Jordan – "Somethin' 4 Da Honeyz" (version 1)
 Boyz II Men feat. Treach, Craig Mack, Busta Rhymes and Method Man – "Vibin'" (version 2)
 Brandy – "Sittin' Up in My Room"
 Blackstreet feat. SWV and Craig Mack – "Tonite's the Night" (remix)
 Hodge – "Head Nod" (remix)
 Mic Geronimo – "Masta I.C."
 OutKast – "Benz or Beamer"
 Ol' Dirty Bastard – "Shimmy Shimmy Ya/Baby C'Mon"
 Solo – "Where Do You Want Me to Put It"
 Lin Que feat. MC Lyte – "Let It Fall"
 Immature feat. Smooth – "We Got It"
 Double XX Posse – "Money Talks"
 A Few Good Men – "Tonite"
 Little Shawn feat. The Notorious B.I.G – "Dom Perignon"
 Brownstone feat. Craig Mack – "If You Love Me (Street Vibe Remix)"
 World Renown – "How Nice I Am"

1996
 Tupac Shakur feat. Dr. Dre and Roger Troutman – "California Love" (version 2: Mad Max, version 3: remix)
 D'Angelo – "Lady"
 R. Kelly feat. Ronald Isley – "Down Low (Nobody Has to Know)" (version 1)
 Busta Rhymes – "Woo Hah!! Got You All in Check" (version 1)
 R. Kelly – "Thank God It's Friday"
 Maxi Priest feat. Shaggy – "That Girl"
 Nas feat. Lauryn Hill – "If I Ruled the World (Imagine That)"
 Nas – "Street Dreams"
 Nas feat. R. Kelly – "Street Dreams (Remix)"
 A Tribe Called Quest – "1nce Again"
 Blackstreet feat. Dr. Dre and Queen Pen – "No Diggity"
 R. Kelly – "I Can't Sleep Baby (If I)" (remix)
 Brandy feat. Wanya Morris of Boyz II Men – "Brokenhearted" (Soulpower Remix)
 A Tribe Called Quest – "Stressed Out" (version 1)
 Jay-Z feat. Mary J. Blige – "Can't Knock the Hustle"
 LL Cool J feat. Total – "Loungin'" (remix)
 Foxy Brown feat. Blackstreet – "Get Me Home"
 R. Kelly – "I Believe I Can Fly"
 Group Therapy feat. Dr. Dre, RBX, KRS-One, B-Real and Nas – "East Coast West Coast Killaz"
 B-Real, Coolio, Method Man, LL Cool J and Busta Rhymes – "Hit 'Em High (The Monstars' Anthem)"
 Mista – "Blackberry Molasses"
 The Isley Brothers feat. R. Kelly – "Let's Lay Together"
 Total – "No One Else"
 Babyface feat. LL Cool J, Jody Watley, etc. – "This Is For The Lover In You"
 LL Cool J feat. Keith Murray, Prodigy, Fat Joe, and Foxy Brown – "I Shot Ya"
 R. Kelly – "I Can't Sleep (Baby If I)"
 R. Kelly – "Down Low Remix (Blame it on the Mo)"

1997
 Missy Elliott – "The Rain (Supa Dupa Fly)"
 Puff Daddy feat. Faith Evans and 112 – "I'll Be Missing You"
 R. Kelly – "Gotham City"
 The Notorious B.I.G. feat. Puff Daddy and Mase – "Mo Money Mo Problems"
 Mary J. Blige – "Everything"
 Busta Rhymes – "Put Your Hands Where My Eyes Could See"
 Missy Elliott feat. Da Brat – "Sock It 2 Me"
 Jay-Z feat. Foxy Brown and Babyface – "(Always Be My) Sunshine"
 Busta Rhymes – "Dangerous"
 Mase – "Feel So Good"
 Wild Orchid – "Supernatural"
 Will Smith – "Gettin' Jiggy wit It"
 Usher – "Nice and Slow"
 Refugee Camp All-Stars feat. Pras and Ky-Mani Marley – "Avenues"
 Scarface – "Mary Jane"
 R. Kelly – "Gotham City Remix"
 Snow – "Anything for You" (All-Star Cast Remix)
 The Firm - "Firm Biz"

1998
 DMX feat. Sheek Louch (The Lox) – "Get At Me Dog"
 DMX feat. Faith Evans – "How's It Goin' Down"
 Faith Evans – "Love Like This"
 Mel B feat. Missy Elliott – "I Want You Back"
 Jermaine Dupri feat. Mariah Carey – "Sweetheart"
 Mýa feat. Noreaga and Raekwon – "Movin' On"
 Kelly Price feat. R. Kelly and Ron Isley – "Friend of Mine"
 Busta Rhymes – "Gimme Some More'"
 DMX, Nas, Method Man and Ja Rule – "Grand Finale"
 Made Men feat. The Lox - "Tommy's Theme"
 R. Kelly – "Half on a Baby"
 R. Kelly feat. Keith Murray – "Home Alone"
 Taral Hicks – "Silly"
 Taral Hicks – "Ooh, Ooh Baby"

1999
 112 feat. Lil' Zane – "Anywhere"
 TLC – "No Scrubs"
 Q-Tip – "I Can Do It"
 Ja Rule – "Holla Holla"
 Ja Rule – "Holla Holla (Remix)"
 Ja Rule feat. Cadillac Tah and Black Child – "Murda 4 Life"
 Ja Rule – "It's Murda/Kill 'Em All"
 Ja Rule feat. Ronald Isley – "Daddy's Little Baby"
 Ja Rule – "How Many Wanna"
 Method Man feat. D'Angelo – "Break Ups 2 Make Ups"
 Busta Rhymes – "Tear da Roof Off/Party Going on Over Here"
 Busta Rhymes feat. Janet Jackson – "What's It Gonna Be?"
 Nas feat. Puff Daddy – "Hate Me Now"
 Missy Elliott – "She's a Bitch"
 Mase feat. Blackstreet – "Get Ready"
 Noreaga – "Oh No" 
 Puff Daddy feat. R. Kelly – "Satisfy You"
 Mobb Deep feat. Lil' Kim – "Quiet Storm" (version 2: remix)
 Dr. Dre feat. Snoop Dogg – "Still D.R.E."
 Q-Tip – "Vivrant Thing"
 Ol' Dirty Bastard feat. Kelis – "Got Your Money"
 Missy Elliott feat. Big Boi and Nicole – "All n My Grill"
 Kelis – "Caught out There"
 Mobb Deep feat. Nas – "It's Mine"
 Sisqó – "Got to Get It"
 Missy Elliott feat. Nas, Lil' Mo and Eve – "Hot Boyz"
 So Plush – "Things I've Heard Before"
 Q-Tip – "Breathe and Stop" (version 2)

2000s

2000
 Jay-Z feat. UGK – "Big Pimpin'"
 No Doubt – "Ex–Girlfriend"
 Busta Rhymes – "Get Out!!"
 Macy Gray – "Why Didn't You Call Me"
 R. Kelly – "Bad Man"
 DMX feat. Sisqó – "What They Really Want"
 LL Cool J – "Imagine That"
 Wyclef Jean feat. The Rock – "It Doesn't Matter"
 Busta Rhymes – "Fire"
 Jay-Z feat. Memphis Bleek and Amil – "Hey Papi"
 Mýa feat. Jay-Z – "Best of Me (Holla Main Mix)"
 Funkmaster Flex feat. DMX – "Do You?"
 Roni Size & Reprazent – "Who Told You"
 Ja Rule feat. Lil' Mo and Vita – "Put It On Me"
 The Murderers – "We Don't Give A %^#$"
 The Murderers feat. Vita – "Vita, Vita, Vita"
 Kobe Bryant feat. Tyra Banks – "K.O.B.E."
 The Murderers feat Ja Rule, Vita, Black Child, Tah Murdah, Memphis Bleek and Busta Rhymes – "Holla Holla Remix" 
 Crystal Sierra feat. Stylez Skillz – "Playa No More"
 Outsiderz 4 Life – "College Degree"

2001 
 DMX – "Ain't No Sunshine"
 Busta Rhymes feat. Kelis – "What It Is/Grimey"
 Snoop Dogg feat. Tha Eastsidaz, Master P and Nate Dogg – "Lay Low"
 Eric Benet – "Love Don't Love Me"
 Babyface – "There She Goes"
 Vita – "Justify My Love"
 Lisa "Left Eye" Lopes – "The Block Party"
 Jessica Simpson – "A Little Bit"
 Ginuwine – "Differences"
 FUBU feat. LL Cool J, Keith Murray, and Ludacris – "Fatty Girl"
 Busta Rhymes – "As I Come Back/Break Ya Neck"
 Shelby Lynne – "Killin' Kind"
 Stella Soleil – "Kiss Kiss"
 Method Man – "Party & Bull%#!*"
 Aaliyah – "Rock The Boat"

2002
 N*E*R*D – "Rock Star" (unreleased version)
 Nelly Furtado – "...On the Radio (Remember the Days)"
 Boyz II Men – "The Color of Love"
 Blu Cantrell feat. Sean Paul – "Breathe" (remix)

2003
 Ashanti – "Rain on Me" (version 1)

2004
 Ja Rule feat. R. Kelly & Ashanti – "Wonderful"
 Ashanti – "Only U"
 Teedra Moses – "Be Your Girl"
 New Edition – "Hot 2Nite"
 Rupee – "Tempted to Touch"
 The Game feat. 50 Cent – "How We Do"

2005
 Queen Latifah feat. Al Green – "Simply Beautiful"
 Ashanti - "Only U" (version 2: Dance Version)
 Slim Thug feat. Bun B – "I Ain't Heard of That"
 Kanye West – "Diamonds from Sierra Leone"
 Kanye West feat. Jamie Foxx – "Gold Digger"
 Smitty – "Diamonds on My Neck"
 Robin Thicke feat. Pharrell Williams – "Wanna Love U Girl" (version 2)
 Jamie Foxx feat. Ludacris – "Unpredictable"
 Beyoncé feat. Slim Thug and Bun B – "Check on It"
 Pharrell Williams – "Angel"
 Ne-Yo – "So Sick"
 Killer Mike feat. Big Boi – "My Chrome"

2006
 LL Cool J feat. Jennifer Lopez – "Control Myself"
 Young Jeezy – "My Hood"
 Mary J. Blige – "Enough Cryin'"
 Hoobastank – "If I Were You"
 LL Cool J feat. Lyfe Jennings – "Freeze"
 Lil Jon feat. E-40 and Sean Paul (Youngbloodz) – "Snap Yo Fingers"
 Young Jeezy feat. Lil' Scrappy and T.I. – "Bang"
 Kanye West feat. Paul Wall, GLC and T.I. – "Drive Slow (Remix)"
 Pharrell Williams feat. Kanye West – "Number 1"
 Janet Jackson feat. Nelly – "Call on Me"
 John Legend – "Heaven"
 t.A.T.u. – "Gomenasai"

2007
 Kanye West – "Can't Tell Me Nothing"
 Twista feat. Pharrell – "Give It Up"
 Kenna – "Say Goodbye to Love"
 Kanye West – "Stronger"
 Fam-Lay – "The Beeper Record"
 Ja Rule – "Body"
 Jay-Z feat. Pharrell Williams – "Blue Magic"
 Lupe Fiasco feat. Matthew Santos – "Superstar"
 Ne-Yo – "Go On Girl"

2008
 Shaggy feat. Akon – "What's Love"
 Kanye West – "Homecoming"
 Sean Garrett feat. Ludacris – "Grippin'"
 Mary J. Blige – "Stay Down"
 Lloyd feat. Lil Wayne – "Girls Around the World"
 Coldplay – "Viva la Vida"
 N.E.R.D feat. CRS & Pusha T – "Everyone Nose (All the Girls ....) (Remix)"
 Common feat. Pharrell Williams – "Universal Mind Control"
 Kanye West – "Heartless"
 DJ Khaled feat. Kanye West and T-Pain – "Go Hard"

2009
 Bow Wow feat. Jermaine Dupri – "Roc the Mic"
 Bow Wow feat. Jonhtá Austin – "You Can Get It All"
 Jamie Foxx feat. T-Pain – "Blame It"
 Busta Rhymes feat. T-Pain – "Hustler's Anthem '09"
 Kanye West feat. Young Jeezy – "Amazing"
 Kanye West – "Robocop" (unreleased)
 Swizz Beatz – "When I Step in the Club" (Hennessy Black commercial)
 The-Dream feat. Kanye West – "Walkin' on the Moon"
 Big Sean  – "Getcha Some"
 Jamie Foxx feat. Kanye West, The-Dream and Drake – "Digital Girl (remix)"
 Consequence feat. Kanye West and John Legend – "Whatever U Want"
 Drake feat. Kanye West, Lil Wayne and Eminem – "Forever"
 Diddy – Dirty Money feat. The Notorious B.I.G. – "Angels"
 Dan Balan – "Chica Bomb"
 Mariah Carey – "I Want to Know What Love Is"
 Jay-Z feat. Alicia Keys – "Empire State of Mind"
 Beyoncé feat. Lady Gaga – "Video Phone" (Extended Remix)

2010s

2010
 Nicki Minaj – "Massive Attack"
 Audio feat. Akon – "Magnetic"
 Christina Aguilera – "Not Myself Tonight"
 Diddy – Dirty Money feat. Rick Ross and T.I. – "Hello Good Morning"
 Diddy – Dirty Money feat. Nicki Minaj and Rick Ross – "Hello Good Morning" (remix)
 Rick Ross feat. Kanye West – "Live Fast, Die Young" (unreleased)
 Jessica Mauboy feat. Snoop Dogg – "Get 'Em Girls"
 Bob Sinclar feat. Sean Paul – "Tik Tok"
 Ke$ha – "We R Who We R"
 Jessica Mauboy feat. Ludacris – "Saturday Night"
 Kanye West – "Runaway" (script)

2011
Lil Wayne feat. Cory Gunz – "6 Foot 7 Foot"
Miguel – "Sure Thing"
Kanye West feat. Rihanna – "All of the Lights"
Kim Kardashian – "Jam (Turn It Up)"
Big Sean  feat. Kanye West and Roscoe Dash – "Marvin & Chardonnay"
Coldplay – "Paradise" (unreleased)
Ja Rule – "Real Life Fantasy"
Josh Baze – "We Made It"
Robin Thicke – "Love After War"
Willow Smith feat. Nicki Minaj – "Fireball"

2012
 Nicki Minaj – "Stupid Hoe"
 Busta Rhymes feat. Chris Brown – "Why Stop Now"
 Brandy feat. Chris Brown – "Put It Down"
 Jack White – "Freedom at 21"
 DJ Khaled – "I Wish You Would" (feat. Kanye West and Rick Ross) / "Cold"
 Fat Joe feat. Kanye West – "Pride N Joy"
 Nicki Minaj – "Va Va Voom"
 Nicki Minaj – "Roman in Moscow" (unreleased)

2013
 Nikki Williams – "Glowing"
 Joe – "I'd Rather Have Love"
Meek Mill - "Levels"
Beyoncé feat. Jay-Z - "Drunk in Love"
Beyoncé - "Blow"

2014
 Ludacris feat. Jeremih and Wiz Khalifa - "Party Girls"
 Future feat. Kanye West - "I Won"
 Common feat. Vince Staples - "Kingdom"
 Jennifer Lopez feat. Iggy Azalea - "Booty"

2015
 Jodeci - "Every Moment"
 Jennifer Lopez - "Feel the Light"
 Adam Lambert - "Ghost Town"
Puff Daddy feat. Pharrell - "Finna Get Loose"
 The Neighbourhood - "R.I.P. 2 My Youth"
Rick Ross feat. The Dream - "Money Dance"
Puff Daddy - "Workin'"
 Puff Daddy & The Family feat. King Los, Styles P and Lil' Kim - "The Auction"

2016
 Travis Scott - "90210"
 Alicia Keys feat. ASAP Rocky - "Blended Family (What You Do For Love)"

2017
 Tyga feat. Desiigner - "Gucci Snakes"
  Dice Soho - "Giraffe"

2018
 Nicki Minaj – "Bed" (feat. Ariana Grande)
Nicki Minaj - "Barbie Dreams"
Post Malone feat. Nicki Minaj -"Ball for Me" (unreleased)

2019
Megan Thee Stallion - "Cash Sh*t" (feat. DaBaby)

2020s

2020
Griselda - "Dr. Birds"
PartyNextDoor feat. Drake - "Loyal" (unreleased version)
T.I. feat. Rahky - "Hypno"
Future & Lil Uzi Vert - Pluto x Baby Pluto (promotion videos)
Future & Lil Uzi Vert - "That's It"
Future & Lil Uzi Vert - "Over Your Head"
A Boogie wit da Hoodie & Young Thug - "Might Not Give Up"

2021
DJ Khaled feat. Nas, Jay-Z, James Fauntleroy and Beyoncé - "Sorry Not Sorry"

References

External links
Hype Williams  at MVDBase.com

Director videographies